The Conrad Boys is a 2006 American drama film starring Justin Lo, Nick Bartzen, Boo Boo Stewart and Barry Shay. The film was written and directed by Justin Lo. The film was produced by Justin Lo and Jose Ramirez.

Cast
 Justin Lo as Charlie Conrad
 Booboo Stewart as Ben Conrad
 Nick Bartzen as Jordan Rivers
 Barry Shay as Doug Conrad
 Nancy Hancock as Tori Marshall
 Katelyn Ann Clark as Louise Denver
 Dorian Frankel as Evelyn Bridge
 Lauren Xerxes as Suzie Conrad
 Bruce Blauer as Vince Miller
 Shane Arenal as Andy Calhoun
 Bart Shattuck as Attorney Mark Poland
 Connie Schiro as Principal Brower
 Kari McDermott as Paula
 Keegan Bell as PJ
 Wesley Stiller as Keaton
 Scott Erickson as Rude Boy
 Ryan Walsh as College Guy
 Kristine Arnold as Party Girl
 Eduardo Ricketts Jr. as Motel Manager
 B. Anthony Cohen as Priest
 Michael Falls as Doctor
 Don Mack as English Professor

Release
The Conrad Boys was released on April 24, 2006 at the Newport Beach International Film Festival and was released into the theaters in United States on June 6, 2006 and was released to DVD on August 15, 2006.

See also
List of lesbian, gay, bisexual, or transgender-related films by storyline

References

External links
 
 

2006 films
American drama films
American LGBT-related films
2006 drama films
LGBT-related drama films
Gay-related films
2006 LGBT-related films
LGBT-related coming-of-age films
2000s English-language films
2000s American films